The Supernatural Festival is an ecology & music open-air festival held annually in April, located at the park-forest Košutnjak, in Belgrade capitol of Serbia. Supernatural Festival has the aim to raise ecological awareness about the importance of nature, ecology, natural way of life and proper behavior towards Planet. Also, apart from being a festival is also an ecological movement that uses art, media and event as the means to promote ecology and educate people  about importance of this subject. Festival celebrates the Day of The Planet Earth, 22 April. Every year the festival takes place at Košutnjak, one of the most popular recreational places in Belgrade located 6 km southwest from the city downtown. Settled in beautiful natural landscape, just next to the national historic landmark Hajdučka Česma. The festival makes place for 20,000 visitors every year with growing support. Supernatural festival takes place during the day, in the sunshine, thus making point about the energy efficiency issue. All of the festival stages use the biodiesel fuel as main power supply, and visitors are constantly encouraged to recycle their waste throughout the festival. The event usually starts early in the morning with children program including numerous workshops all concerning human environment and recycling techniques.

History
Since the 2007. the festival started growing into one of the most recognized ecology and music festivals in Serbia and Balkans. What started as a scarce gathering at the Belgrade's natural resource of Košutnjak took shape as a festival promoting not only domestic and foreign music but also healthy and energy efficient way of life. In the opening year of 2007. over 5,000 visitors gathered at the Supernatural festival grounds, with several environmental organizations doing workshops and seminars about the importance of nature and recycling. Single festival stage featured bands like Obojeni Program, Shiroko, Belgrade Yard Sound System, Kinetic Vibe, Goran Milošević etc. The following year of 2008. included the children program that starts early in the morning, thus opening the festival for the young giving them a chance to learn more about the environment. The Supernatural Festival now featured two stages: main stage that hosted live acts such as Darkwood Dub, Petrol, Neočekivana Sila Koja Se Iznenada Pojavljuje i Rešava Stvar, Autopark, Vlada Janjić, Gordan Paunović, and the second more electronic-oriented stage "Disko Livada" (Disco Meadows) that hosted performers such as DJ Flip, Tijana T, DJ Neca, and Zalutale sa Rejva.

2009
On 26 April 2009, Supernatural Festival hosted some of the best rock, dub, reggae and alternative acts in Serbia, as well as one acclaimed foreign group. Also, over 20 ecological organizations were present at the festival with their own creative programs and workshops promoting environmental awareness. The conditions to enter the festival were to bring three aluminum cans and three plastic bottles as well, and recycle them at the festival gates. The alternative way was to buy the ticket at the affordable price of 400RSD. Educational and music program for children started at 9AM offering them a chance to learn more about recycling and other environmental issues. The regular program started later that day with workshops covering the topic like recycling, waste management, renewable energy with practical demonstrations, nylon art and many more. The main stage, run entirely with biodiesel fuel, hosted the headliners for the Supernatural 2009. English group Dub Pistols. Following artists performed at main stage and "disko livada" that day: Rambo Amadeus, Eva Braun (band), Jarboli, Veliki Prezir, Shiroko, Vlada Janjić, Gordan Paunović, Banana Rave, Funky Šljiva, Indie Go!, Idemo na Mars, Leontina Vukomanovic, Bill Brewster, Irie FM, Miško Plavi, Tijana T, Braća Burazeri, DJ Peca, Dečiji hor "Čarolija" children choir and many more. Products such as organic food, wooden nest boxes and biodegradable carrying bags were available at the festival shop. Over 20,000 visitors gathered to support to bands and festival.

2010

The Supernatural Festival for the year 2010 was held on 25 April, at the same traditional place Košutnjak, Belgrade near the historic landmark Hajdučka Česma. Some of the most prominent regional organizations in the domain of ecology, natural environment and renewable energy announced their presence at the Supernatural Festival 2010. On November 7, 2009, Supernatural Festival announced an open-call public competition for the most original architectural solution for festival pavilions. Each solution was to employ new, affordable, biodegradable materials, sustainable design and green technologies. Several workshops were to be held regarding the topic green architecture topic.

2013 
The 7th Supernatural Festival was held on April 22, 2013. 7000 people were part of this event.

2016 
The 10th Supernatural Festival was held on April 23, 2016 at Košutnjak, Belgrade.

2017 
The 11th Supernatural Festival was held on April 23, 2017 at Ada Huja, an island on Danube river.

References

Sources

 
Balkan InSight 
EXIT Festival

External links
 

Serbian culture
Music festivals in Serbia
Tourism in Serbia
Music in Belgrade
Music festivals established in 2007
Rock festivals in Serbia
Spring (season) events in Serbia
2007 establishments in Serbia